Parachiona is a genus of insects belonging to the family Limnephilidae.

The species of this genus are found in Europe.

Species:
 Parachiona picicornis (Pictet, 1834)

References

Limnephilidae
Insects of Europe
Trichoptera genera